The Prescription Act 1832 (c 71) is an Act of the Parliament of the United Kingdom concerning English land law, and particularly the method for acquiring an easement. It was passed on 1 August 1832.

History
Common law prescription assumed continuous prescriptive rights from 1189 when the legal regime officially began, all time before which having been designated as time immemorial. The Prescription Act 1832 was written hastily as a response to a criticism by Jeremy Bentham, who proposed the complete elimination of common law. It practically supersedes common law prescription but does not actually invalidate it.

Contents
 s 1 (not officially numbered), claims to right of common and other profits-à-prendre not to be defeated after thirty years enjoyment by merely showing the commencement; after sixty years enjoyment the right to be absolute, unless had by consent or agreement.

 s 2, In claims of right of way or other easement the periods to be twenty years and forty years.

 s 3, Claim to the use of light enjoyed for 20 years.

 s 4, Before mentioned periods to be deemed those next before suits.

 s 5, In actions on the case, the claimant may allege his right generally, as at present. In pleas to trespass and certain other pleadings, the period mentioned in this Act may be alleged. Exceptions, &c. to be replied to specially.

 s 6, Presumption to be allowed in claims here provided for.

 s 7, Proviso for infants, &c.

 s 8, What time to be excluded in computing the term of forty years appointed by this Act.

 s 9,  Not to extend to Scotland or Ireland (limitation).

 s 10, Commencement of Act.

 s 11, Act may be amended.

Status outside the United Kingdom

New Zealand 
In New Zealand, the Imperial Laws Application Act 1988, an Act of the New Zealand Parliament, provided that the Prescription Act 1832 formed part of the law of New Zealand. On 1 January 2008, the Prescription Act 1832 was repealed by the Property Law Act 2007 and ceased to have effect in New Zealand.

Western Australia 
On 11 April 1836, the Imperial Acts Adopting Act 1836, an Act of the Parliament of Western Australia, transposed the Prescription Act 1832 into the law of Western Australia. As of January 2021, the Prescription Act 1832 remains in force in Western Australia.

Criticism and proposed reform 
The Law Commission have described the Prescription Act as "one of the worst drafted Acts on the Statute Book" and called for it to be repealed and replaced.

See also

English land law
English property law

References

External links
Prescription Act 1832 on legislation.gov.uk

United Kingdom Acts of Parliament 1832
English property law